The 1990–91 season is Real Madrid Club de Fútbol's 89th season in existence and the club's 60th consecutive season in the top flight of Spanish football.

Summary
In the summertime, Welsh head coach John Benjamin Toshack asked for several changes, including the transfers of Bernd Schuster to local rivals Atlético Madrid and defender Oscar Ruggeri, together with midfielder Martín Vázquez, to Torino FC. Meanwhile, President Ramon Mendoza, after a failed bid for Liverpool's John Barnes, reinforced the club with Gheorghe Hagi, Predrag Spasić (after Gheorghe Popescu rejected an offer from Mendoza) and Villaroya. Following a losing streak sinking the team down to the 6th place in the league, Mendoza fired Toshack on 25 November 1990 and appointed club legend Alfredo Di Stéfano as a new head coach. The team clinched the Supercopa de España, defeating FC Barcelona but the situation in the league was worsened with lost matches against Athletic Bilbao, Osasuna, Atlético Madrid and Barcelona.

During February, forward Hugo Sánchez suffered his first injury, and the squad was eliminated in the Copa del Rey round of 16 by Atlético Madrid. Then in March, with a high risk of failing to qualify for next year's European competitions, the team was defeated by Russian side Spartak Moscow at the Santiago Bernabéu Stadium in the European Cup quarter-finals, shattering the chances of Alfredo Di Stéfano to stay as a coach and he resigned after the elimination. After one game with Ramón Grosso as an interim manager, the club appointed Radomir Antić as a new permanent head coach.

Surprisingly, despite the chaotic situation and Hugo Sánchez out for the rest of season since 25 April, Antic managed the squad to reach the third spot in the league standings and the right to play in the 1991–92 UEFA Cup. His notable successes included matches won against Atlético Madrid and Barcelona in the final rounds of the season.

Squad

Transfers

In

from  Steaua București
 from Málaga CF
 from CD Logroñés
 from FC Barcelona
 from CD Logroñés
 from  Partizan
 from Real Zaragoza
 from  Ferrocarril Oeste (January)

Out

 to CD Logroñés
 to CD Tenerife
 to Real Zaragoza
 to CD Tenerife
 to  Torino FC
 to  Velez Sarsfield
 to Atlético Madrid

Competitions

La Liga

League table

Results by round

Matches

Copa del Rey

Round of 16

Supercopa de España

European Cup

First round

Second round

Quarter-finals

Statistics

Appearances and goals
During the 1990–91 season, Real Madrid used 26 different players comprising five nationalities. The table below shows the number of appearances and goals scored by each player.

References
 Real Madrid – 1990–91 BDFutbol

Real
Real Madrid CF seasons